The Plaxton Centro was a low entry single-decker bus bodywork designed by Bluebird Vehicles and manufactured by Plaxton.

It was launched on the VDL SB120 chassis in February 2006 with the first built for Johnson Transport of Brae in the Shetland Islands. Arriva North West & Wales was the first big fleet order with 10 registered in late 2006. In 2006, it was also made available on the VDL SB200, followed in 2007 by the MAN 12.240 and the Volvo B7RLE. The first Volvo B7RLE was purchased by Wessex Bus for the Bristol park & ride service. 

In 2008, East Yorkshire Motor Services took delivery of six Centro bodied Volvo B7RLEs. In 2010, Blackpool Transport took delivery of nine B7RLEs.  Plaxton bodied the MAN 14.220 chassis in 2008 before this was replaced by the MAN 14.240 in 2009. Other purchasers of the Centro include Arriva, Centrebus, Diamond Bus, GHA Coaches and TM Travel. 

By 2010, the Centro was no longer available from Plaxton after parent company Alexander Dennis phased it out in favour of its own Enviro200 and Enviro300. The last deliveries were in late 2010 and were 2009 season built bodies.

Gallery

See also

References

External links

Plaxton Centro Flickr gallery

Centro
Low-floor buses
Low-entry buses
Midibuses
Vehicles introduced in 2006